The Daily Record is an American, English language daily (Mon. thru Fri.) newspaper headquartered in Dunn, Harnett County, North Carolina.

History
The Daily Record is a member of the North Carolina Newspaper Association.  The newspaper was previously known as:
 The Daily Record. (Dunn, N.C.) 1950-1978, OCLC:  13168584 
 The Dunn Dispatch. (Dunn, N.C.) 1914-1978, OCLC:  26794344

See also
 List of newspapers in North Carolina

References

Daily newspapers published in North Carolina